Johannes A. van Paradijs (9 June 1946 – 2 November 1999) was a Dutch high-energy astrophysicist. He is best known for discovering the first optical afterglow of a gamma-ray burst, GRB 970228, in February 1997, together with two of his students, and for establishing that gamma-ray bursts are extragalactic events. He was married to the astrophysicist Chryssa Kouveliotou.

Research
Van Paradijs determined the first mass of a neutron star, the X-ray pulsar Vela X-1 in 1975. In 1978 he showed that X-ray bursters are neutron stars in binary systems. Using spectroscopic mapping, he was the first to spatially resolve an accretion disk.

Academic career
Van Paradijs obtained his PhD at the University of Amsterdam, Netherlands, in 1975, working on cool giant stars. His thesis was entitled "Studies of line spectra of G- and K-type stars" and his supervisor was David Koelbloed. Afterwards he started working on X-ray binaries. In 1988 he was appointed full professor at the University of Amsterdam, and later he worked part-time at the University of Alabama in Huntsville, U.S. He published over 400 scientific papers, including many with long-time collaborator Walter Lewin of MIT.

The minor planet 9259 Janvanparadijs was named after him.

References

External links
The Scientific Life and Work of Jan van Paradijs

1946 births
1999 deaths
Scientists from Haarlem
20th-century Dutch astronomers
Academic staff of the University of Amsterdam
University of Alabama in Huntsville faculty
University of Amsterdam alumni
Deaths from cancer in the Netherlands